Hero City may refer to:

 Hero City (Soviet Union), awarded 1965–1985 to cities now in Belarus, Russia, and Ukraine
 Hero City of Ukraine, awarded 2022
 Hero Cities of Yugoslavia, awarded 1970–1975
 Leningrad Hero City Obelisk, a monument

See also
City of Heroes an online game.